In enzymology, an adenosylcobinamide hydrolase is an enzyme that catalyzes the chemical reaction

adenosylcobinamide + H2O  adenosylcobyric acid + (R)-1-aminopropan-2-ol

Thus, the two substrates of this enzyme are adenosylcobinamide and H2O, whereas its two products are adenosylcobyric acid and (R)-1-aminopropan-2-ol.

This enzyme belongs to the family of hydrolases, those acting on carbon-nitrogen bonds other than peptide bonds, specifically in linear amides.  The systematic name of this enzyme class is adenosylcobinamide amidohydrolase. Other names in common use include CbiZ, and AdoCbi amidohydrolase.  This enzyme participates in porphyrin and chlorophyll metabolism.

References

 

EC 3.5.1
Enzymes of unknown structure